Patrina Allen (born 17 April 1975) is a Jamaican hurdler. She competed in the 400 metres hurdles at the 2000 Summer Olympics and the 2004 Summer Olympics.

References

External links
 

1975 births
Living people
Athletes (track and field) at the 2000 Summer Olympics
Athletes (track and field) at the 2004 Summer Olympics
Jamaican female hurdlers
Olympic athletes of Jamaica